Leucospermum prostratum is a trailing shrub of up to  in diameter from the Proteaceae. It has alternately set, about 3 cm (1.2 in) long, lance-shaped, olive-colored, upright leaves, and produces sweetly scented, compact, hemispherical flower heads, with long styles sticking out far from the perianth tube, which jointly give the flower head the appearance of a pincushion. The fragrant flowers found between July and December are initially yellow but turn orange when older. It is an endemic species restricted to the south coast of the Western Cape province of South Africa. Its common name is yellow-trailing pincushion.

Taxonomy 
The yellow-trailing pincushion was first described by Carl Peter Thunberg in 1794 as Protea prostrata. In 1809, Joseph Knight published a book titled On the cultivation of the plants belonging to the natural order of Proteeae, that contained an extensive revision of the Proteaceae attributed to  Richard Anthony Salisbury. He described Leucadendron glomiferum, based on another specimen than Thunberg's description. In 1856 Carl Meissner creating the new combination Leucadendron prostratum. He also recognised the name Leucospermum diffusum that Robert Brown had published in 1810 without a description, and provided the description. Otto Stapf assigned the plant in 1912 to the genus Leucospremum and made the new combination L.  prostratum.

L. prostratum has been assigned to the section Diastelloidea. No hybrids have been found between L. pedunculatum and L. prostratum even when growing next to each other (in Kleyn Hagel Kraal near Pearly Beach).

The species name prostratum is a Latin word meaning "lying on the ground".

Description 
The four lobes of the perianth curl back on themselves and may be slightly hairy. The style is straight, 1–1½ cm (0.4–0.6 in) long, initially pale later becoming orange. The flowers of Leucospermum prostratum are sweetly scented.

Differences with related species 
L. pedunculatum and L. prostratum look like each other. Both have trailing stems, ascending and entire leaves without teeth, perianth lobes that are free and curl back on themselves, straight or somewhat curved styles topped by cylindric pollen-presenters. L. prostratum differs in having branches emerge from the ground, yellow flowers that age to orange and styles of 1–1½ cm (0.4–0.6 in) long. Although L. prostratum is not closely related, it can easily be mistaken for L. hypophyllocarpodendron that is also a trailing shrub with upright leaves and small yellow flower heads, but that species has leaves with three teeth with bony tips, and the perianth lobes do not separate, but remain attached. L. gracile is another trailing species with yellow flower heads fading to orange, but these are larger and have a flat top, as is best seen from the side.

Distribution, habitat and ecology 
The yellow-trailing pincushion can be found from the Kogelberg, along the southern coast from Pringle Bay to Franskraalstrand and inland to the Groenland Mountains in the west, Papies Vlei and the Elim hills in the east. It has a preference for sandy coastal flats and when it occurs in the hills, it is restricted to sandy patches of weathered Table Mountain Sandstone. L. prostratum survives even very intense and repeated wildfires that are natural to the fynbos, because it regenerates from the subterranean rootstock. The plants are pollinated by bees, butterflies and flies. The seeds are released from the flower heads about two months after flowering and are collected by ants that carry them to their underground nests. Chemicals released by fire have a positive effect on the germination of seeds of the yellow-trailing pincushion.

Conservation 
L. prostratum is regarded vulnerable because of a decreasing population, which is negatively impacted by direct competition from invasive species and habitat loss.

References

External links 
 several photos

Endemic flora of South Africa
Plants described in 1794
prostratum